Missing Richard Simmons is an investigative journalism podcast hosted by journalist Dan Taberski and created by Stitcher, First Look Media and Pineapple Street Media. The first episode was released on February 15, 2017, with the following five episodes released weekly.

Synopsis
Missing Richard Simmons focuses on the sudden retirement from public life of the fitness instructor and actor Richard Simmons. After having an illustrious media career spanning over 30 years, and known for interacting with fans on a personal level, Simmons disappeared from the public eye in February 2014. Not only did Simmons no longer appear in the media, he also stopped teaching his regular exercise classes at his gym – Slimmons – and stopped corresponding with his friends and fans. Former producer on The Daily Show, Dan Taberski sets out to find out why.

Persons involved
 Dan Taberski – The host, a filmmaker and former Slimmons attendee 
 Richard Simmons – Fitness instructor and actor, the focus of the podcast
 Teresa Reveles – Richard's housekeeper of over 30 years
 Mauro Oliveira – Richard's friend and former masseuse 
 Lennie Simmons – Richard's brother
 Gerry "GG" Sinclair – A student and friend of Richard's for over 40 years

Episodes

Reception
Missing Richard Simmons was met with mixed reviews from critics. Amanda Hess of the New York Times described the podcast as "morally suspect", while also stating it was an invasion of Simmons' privacy. Similar sentiments were raised by Rolling Stone, The Week and Vox amongst others. Despite this however, these critics would also mention the "instantly engaging" nature of the podcast, with 
Vulture.com calling it "the strongest narrative podcast out there."

Missing Richard Simmons proved popular with audiences, topping the iTunes podcast charts in Australia, Canada, United Kingdom and United States. In the United States, the podcast spent almost three weeks in the number one spot.

References

External links
 

Investigative journalism
Infotainment
Audio podcasts
2017 podcast debuts